Ken Andrew (born 30 May 1943) is a South African politician. He was born in Cape Town and matriculated from Rondebosch Boys' High School as head boy. Andrew studied at the University of Cape Town where he achieved his BSc degree and later a Masters in business administration. He is married to Adrianne and has two children.

Political career 
While still at the University of Cape Town he chaired the local committee of the National Union of South African Students. Later in 1961 he joined the Progressive Party which was succeeded by the Progressive Federal Party in 1978. The party was later changed to the Democratic Party where he became its federal chairman from 1991 to 1994.

References

1943 births
South African people of British descent
Living people
Politicians from Cape Town
Alumni of Rondebosch Boys' High School
University of Cape Town alumni
White South African people
Progressive Party (South Africa) politicians
Progressive Federal Party politicians
Democratic Party (South Africa) politicians